Kansas's 2nd Senate district is one of 40 districts in the Kansas Senate. It has been represented by Democrat Marci Francisco since 2005.

Geography
District 2 is based in Lawrence, covering the University of Kansas and much of the city's downtown in Douglas County, as well as most of Jefferson County to the north.

The district is located entirely within Kansas's 2nd congressional district, and overlaps with the 10th, 44th, 45th, 46th, and 47th districts of the Kansas House of Representatives.

Recent election results

2020

2016

2012

Federal and statewide results in District 2

References

2
Douglas County, Kansas
Jefferson County, Kansas